"New Love" is a song by British-American music duo Silk City, featuring vocals from English singer Ellie Goulding. It was released as a digital download and for streaming on 21 January 2021. The song was written by Clément Picard, Ellie Goulding, Mark Ronson, Maxime Picard, Steve McCutcheon and Thomas Wesley Pentz.

Background
In a statement, Goulding said, "The song is about losing yourself on your own, not needing to be seen, knowing that the one that got away could be just as happy as this too. The main concept is dancing on your own not needing to be seen. It seemed only right to make a tune together at a time where we all need to dance and be free, even if just in our kitchens." In another statement, Diplo said, "I'm always stoked to get back in the studio with Mark. We've been constantly trading ideas since the start of Silk City and finally found the time to bring some of them to life. We came out with this classic house record and Ellie was kind enough to lend her voice to it." Mark Ronson also said, "I love the music that comes out when Wes and I get together. It has a joy to it that's different from everything else I work on. I've known Ellie for over ten years, and it's great to finally get to make something together. Her voice has such a pure tone that cuts through everything."

Music video
A music video to accompany the release of "New Love" was first released onto YouTube on 22 January 2021. The video was directed by Ana Sting.

Personnel
Credits adapted from Tidal.
 Alex Metric – producer
 Picard Brothers – producer
 Riton – producer
 Silk City – producer, associated performer
 Clément Picard – composer, lyricist
 Ellie Goulding – composer, lyricist, associated performer
 Mark Ronson – composer, lyricist, associated performer, featured artist
 Maxime Picard – composer, lyricist
 Steve McCutcheon – composer, lyricist
 Thomas Wesley Pentz – composer, lyricist, associated performer, featured artist

Charts

Weekly charts

Year-end charts

Release history

References

2021 songs
2021 singles
Ellie Goulding songs
Silk City (duo) songs
Songs written by Diplo
Songs written by Mark Ronson